Cheshmeh Sefid-e Usin (also Romanized as Cheshmeh Sefīd-e Ūsīn; also known as Cheshmeh Sefīd-e Ardeshīrī and Cheshmeh-ye Sefīd-e Ardeshīrī) is a village in Gowavar Rural District, Govar District, Gilan-e Gharb County, Kermanshah Province, Iran. At the 2006 census, its population was 198, in 34 families.

References 

Populated places in Gilan-e Gharb County